The .308 Marlin Express is a cartridge developed in 2007 by Marlin Firearms and Hornady.  It is based on the .307 Winchester with a goal to duplicate .308 Winchester performance. The cartridge uses a slightly shorter, semi-rimmed case similar to that of the .220 Swift to function in lever-action rifles.  As introduced in Hornady's LEVERevolution line of cartridges, it is the highest velocity production cartridge designed for lever action rifles with tubular magazines. It is chambered in Marlin's Model 308MX and 308MXLR rifles using the Marlin Model 336 action.

Comparison
The .308 Marlin Express was designed to produce performance similar to the .308 Winchester. This would give lever-action hunters improved performance over their .30-30 Winchester rounds. The table below shows how the rounds compare. Note that reloading data for  bullets for some of the cartridges is not available. This round was designed with an elastomer tip, so that the .308 designed would be safe for the tubular magazine of lever action rifles.  This softer tip eliminates the hazards of stacking pointed rounds end to end in a tubular magazine.

Ammunition availability
As of 2010, Hornady and Remington remain the only two manufacturers of loaded ammunition in .308 Marlin Express.

See also
 .308 Winchester
 .307 Winchester
 .300 Savage
 .30-30 Winchester
 .338 Marlin Express
 Table of handgun and rifle cartridges

References

 The Marlin Express by Rick Hacker in Guns&Ammo 
 .308 Marlin Express by Chuck Hawks (subscription required)
 308 Marlin Express Reload Data by Hornady

External links
 Chuck Hawk's review of the .308 Marlin Express
 Ideal Deer Cartridges by Chuck Hawks

Pistol and rifle cartridges